Uijeongbujungang Station is a station of the U Line in Uijeongbu-dong, Uijeongbu, Gyeonggi-do, South Korea.

Station layout

Vicinity
Exit 1: Uijeongbu Bubudae Jjigae Street
Exit 2: Bicycle facilities

External links
  Station information from Uijeongbu Light Rail Transit Co., Ltd

Seoul Metropolitan Subway stations
Metro stations in Uijeongbu
Railway stations opened in 2012